The 2nd district of Budapest is a district of Budapest, Hungary. It has an area of 36.34 km² and is situated to the south of the 3rd district and to the north of the 1st district and the 12th district.

Notable places 
 Széll Kálmán tér, one of the city's biggest transport interchanges.
 Mammut shopping centre
 Central Statistical Office Library, one of the largest public libraries in Budapest
 Millenáris Park
 Church of Our Lady of Sarlós, a historic Roman Catholic church built in the 18th century

Politics 
The current mayor of II. District of Budapest is Gergely Örsi (MSZP).

The District Assembly, elected at the 2019 local government elections, is made up of 21 members (1 Mayor, 14 Individual constituencies MEPs and 6 Compensation List MEPs) divided into this political parties and alliances:

List of mayors

Twin towns – sister cities
2nd district of Budapest is twinned with:
 Beşiktaş, Turkey
 Finike, Turkey
 Mosbach, Germany
 Żoliborz (Warsaw), Poland

Notes

References

External links